Events in the year 1901 in Spain.

Incumbents
 Monarch: Alfonso XIII
 Prime Minister: Marcelo Azcárraga Palmero (until 6 March), Práxedes Mateo Sagasta (starting 6 March)

Events
 May 19: Spanish general election, 1901
 Founding of the socialist newspaper La Bandera Roja in Castro Urdiales

Births
 February 3: Ramón J. Sender, novelist (died 1982)
 April 1: Francisco Ascaso (died 1936)
 May 27: Pedro Garfias (died 1967)
 June 29: José Castillo (Spanish Civil War) (died 1936)
 October 15: Enrique Jardiel Poncela (died 1952)

Deaths
 November 29: Francesc Pi i Margall (born 1824)

External links 
 

 
1900s in Spain
Years of the 20th century in Spain
1901 by country